In computer science, a segment tree, also known as a statistic tree, is a tree data structure used for storing information about intervals, or segments. It allows querying which of the stored segments contain a given point. It is, in principle, a static structure and cannot be modified once built.  A similar data structure is the interval tree.

A segment tree for a set  of n intervals uses O(n log n) storage and can be built in O(n log n) time. Segment trees support searching for all the intervals that contain a query point in time O(log n + k), k being the number of retrieved intervals or segments.

Applications of the segment tree are in the areas of computational geometry, geographic information systems and machine learning.

The segment tree can be generalized to higher dimension spaces.

Definition

Description
Let S be a set of intervals, or segments. Let p1, p2, ..., pm be the list of distinct interval endpoints, sorted from left to right. Consider the partitioning of the real line induced by those points. The regions of this partitioning are called elementary intervals. Thus, the elementary intervals are, from left to right:

That is, the list of elementary intervals consists of open intervals between two consecutive endpoints pi and pi+1, alternated with closed intervals consisting of a single endpoint. Single points are treated themselves as intervals because the answer to a query is not necessarily the same at the interior of an elementary interval and its endpoints.

 T is a binary tree.
The elementary interval corresponding to a leaf v is denoted Int(v).
 The internal nodes of T  correspond to intervals that are the union  of elementary intervals: the interval Int(N) corresponding to node N is the union of the intervals corresponding to the leaves of the tree rooted at N. That implies that Int(N) is the union of the intervals of its two children.
 Each node or leaf v in T stores the interval Int(v) and a set   of intervals, in some data structure. This canonical subset of node v contains the intervals [x, x′] from  such that [x, x′] contains Int(v) and does not contain Int(parent(v)). That is, each node in T stores the segments that span through its interval, but do not span through the interval of its parent.

Construction
A segment tree from the set of segments , can be built as follows. The elementary intervals are obtained from that. Then, a balanced binary tree is built on the elementary intervals, and for each node v it is determined the interval Int(v) it represents. It remains to compute the canonical subsets for the nodes. An interval X = [x, x′] can be inserted in a subtree rooted at T, using the following procedure:
 If Int(T) is contained in X then store X at T, and finish.
 Else:
 If X intersects the interval of the left child of T, then insert X in that child, recursively.
 If X intersects the interval of the right child of T, then insert X in that child, recursively.

Query
A query for a segment tree receives a point qx(should be one of the leaves of tree), and retrieves a list of all the segments stored which contain the point qx.

Formally stated; given a node (subtree) v and a query point qx, the query can be done using the following algorithm:
 If v is not a leaf:
 If qx is in Int(left child of v) then
 Perform a query in the left child of v.
 If qx is in Int(right child of v) then
 Perform a query in the right child of v.

In a segment tree that contains n intervals, those containing a given query point can be reported in O(log n + k) time, where k is the number of reported intervals.

Storage requirements
A segment tree T on a set  of n intervals uses O(n log n) storage.

The set  has at most 4n + 1 elementary intervals. Because T is a binary balanced tree with at most 4n + 1 leaves, its height is O(log n). Since any interval is stored at most twice at a given depth of the tree, that the total amount of storage is O(n log n).

Generalization for higher dimensions
The segment tree can be generalized to higher dimension spaces, in the form of multi-level segment trees. In higher dimensional versions, the segment tree stores a collection of axis-parallel (hyper-)rectangles, and can retrieve the rectangles that contain a given query point. The structure uses O(n logd n) storage, and answers queries in O(logd n) time.

The use of fractional cascading lowers the query time bound by a logarithmic factor. The use of the interval tree on the deepest level of associated structures lowers the storage bound by a logarithmic factor.

Notes
A query that asks for all the intervals containing a given point is often referred as a stabbing query.

The segment tree is less efficient than the interval tree for range queries in one dimension, due to its higher storage requirement: O(n log n) against the O(n) of the interval tree. The importance of the segment tree is that the segments within each node’s canonical subset can be stored in any arbitrary manner.

For n intervals whose endpoints are in a small integer range (e.g., in the range [1,…,O(n)]), optimal data structures exist with a linear preprocessing time and query time O(1 + k) for reporting all k intervals containing a given query point.

Another advantage of the segment tree is that it can easily be adapted to counting queries; that is, to report the number of segments containing a given point, instead of reporting the segments themselves. Instead of storing the intervals in the canonical subsets, it can simply store the number of them. Such a segment tree uses linear storage, and requires an O(log n) query time, so it is optimal.

Higher dimensional versions of the interval tree and the priority search tree do not exist; that is, there is no clear extension of these structures that solves the analogous problem in higher dimensions. But the structures can be used as associated structure of segment trees.

History

The segment tree was invented by Jon Bentley in 1977; in "Solutions to Klee’s rectangle problems".

References

Sources cited
 
 http://www.cs.nthu.edu.tw/~wkhon/ds/ds10/tutorial/tutorial6.pdf

External links 

 Segment Tree – CP-Algorithms

Trees (data structures)
Binary trees
Computer graphics data structures